Qasimabad fort also known as Nawab Muhammad Qasim Fort. It was built by Nawab Sheikh Abdullah in 1742. The fort is located in the town of Kasimabad, of Ghazipur District, Uttar Pradesh, India.

References

18th-century forts in India
Forts in Uttar Pradesh